Luciano van Kallen (born 2 November 1977) is a Dutch footballer who played as a forward for Eerste Divisie clubs FC Eindhoven during the 2001–2003 seasons and Stormvogels Telstar during the 2003–2004 season.

References

External links
 voetbal international profile
 

1977 births
Living people
Dutch footballers
Association football forwards
Footballers from Amsterdam
Eerste Divisie players
SC Telstar players
FC Eindhoven players